Randal Mark Kerr McDonnell, 7th Earl of Antrim DL (1878–1933) was a landowner and peer in Northern Ireland, known as Viscount Dunluce until 1918.

Antrim was born at St James's Palace, the son of William McDonnell, 6th Earl of Antrim, whose main seat was Glenarm Castle, which he inherited, with his father's peerages, in 1918. His mother was Louisa, Countess of Antrim.

Educated at Eton College and the Royal Military College, Sandhurst, he was commissioned into the Royal Lancaster Regiment. He was later appointed as a Deputy Lord Lieutenant of County Antrim.

He married Margaret Isabel Talbot, a daughter of John Gilbert Talbot, and they had four children:  
Lady Rose Gwendolen Louisa McDonnell (1909–1993)
Randal John Somerled McDonnell, 8th Earl of Antrim (1911–1977)
Lady Jean Meriel McDonnell (1914–1998)
James Angus Grey McDonnell (1917–2005)

Antrim's middle names commemorated his descent in the male line from Lord Mark Kerr, whose wife inherited the Earldom of Antrim. Their son, Hugh Seymour Kerr, succeeded to the Earldom in due course and assumed the surname of McDonnell in 1836. Through William Kerr, 5th Marquess of Lothian, Antrim was also a descendant of Charles Louis, Elector Palatine, and thus in the Jacobite succession to the throne.

Notes

External links
Randal Mark Kerr McDonnell, 12th Earl of Antrim (1878-1932), Landowner, National Portrait Gallery, London

1878 births
1932 deaths
Earls of Antrim
Graduates of the Royal Military College, Sandhurst
King's Own Royal Regiment officers
People educated at Eton College